Baba Indrajith (born 8 July 1994), is an Indian cricketer who plays for the Tamil Nadu cricket team. Indrajith is a right hand batsman and legbreak bowler and an occasional wicket-keeper. He plays first-class cricket for Tamil Nadu. In September 2017, he scored his first double-century in first-class cricket, playing for India Red in the 2017–18 Duleep Trophy.

In July 2018, he was named in the squad for India Green for the 2018–19 Duleep Trophy. In the opening fixture of the tournament, he made a century, scoring 109 runs. He was the leading run-scorer for India Green in the tournament, with 149 runs in two matches.

He was the leading run-scorer for Tamil Nadu in the 2018–19 Ranji Trophy, with 641 runs in eight matches. In February 2022, he was bought by the Kolkata Knight Riders in the auction for the 2022 Indian Premier League tournament as a wicket-keeper batsman. Indrajith finished the 2021-22 Ranji Trophy season as the leading run-scorer for Tamil Nadu, with 396 runs in three matches, at an average of 99, with three centuries.

References

External links

Indian cricketers
Tamil Nadu cricketers
India Green cricketers
India Red cricketers
Living people
1994 births
Cricketers from Chennai
Kolkata Knight Riders cricketers